PENSEN, formally PEN-2 (presenilin enhancer 2), is a protein that is a regulatory component of the gamma secretase complex, a protease complex responsible for proteolysis of transmembrane proteins such as the Notch protein and amyloid precursor protein (APP). The gamma secretase complex consists of PEN-2, APH-1, nicastrin, and the catalytic subunit presenilin. PEN-2 is a 101-amino acid integral membrane protein likely with a topology such that both the N-terminus and the C-terminus face first the lumen of the endoplasmic reticulum and later the extracellular environment. Biochemical studies have shown that a conserved sequence motif D-Y-L-S-F at the C-terminus, as well as the overall length of the C-terminal tail, is required for the formation of an active gamma secretase complex.

PEN-2 binds to metformin at therapeutic concentration and may be responsible for its AMPK-activating effects. PEN2-metformin in turn binds to ATP6AP1 to inhibit v-ATPase activity.

References

External links 
 

Alzheimer's disease
Proteins

de:PEN-2